Amblimation was the British animation production subsidiary of Amblin Entertainment. It was formed by Steven Spielberg in May 1989, following the success of Who Framed Roger Rabbit (1988), and after he parted ways with Don Bluth, due to creative differences. It was stationed in what was originally the D. Napier & Son factory in Acton, London and had 250 crew members from 15 different nations. It only produced three feature films: An American Tail: Fievel Goes West (1991), We're Back! A Dinosaur's Story (1993), and Balto (1995), all three of which were composed by James Horner and distributed by Universal Pictures. The company's mascot, Fievel Mousekewitz, appears in its production logo.

The studio closed in 1997 after only eight years of operation and its office building became a self-storage facility called Access Self-Storage. All 250 of Amblimation's crew members went on to join DreamWorks Animation, which was later acquired in 2016 by Universal's parent company NBCUniversal for $3.8 billion.

Filmography

Theatrical feature films

See also

Illumination
Amblin Entertainment
DreamWorks Animation
Universal Interactive
Universal Animation Studios
Sullivan Bluth Studios
 List of Universal Pictures theatrical animated feature films
 List of unproduced Universal Pictures animated projects

References

Amblin Entertainment
Defunct film and television production companies of the United Kingdom
Film production companies of the United Kingdom
Television production companies of the United Kingdom
American animation studios
British animation studios
Defunct companies based in London
British companies established in 1989
Mass media companies established in 1989
Mass media companies disestablished in 1997
1989 establishments in England
1997 disestablishments in England
Steven Spielberg